Hypodoxa horridata is a moth of the family Geometridae first described by Francis Walker in 1863. It is found in Australia, including New South Wales.

References

Moths described in 1863
Pseudoterpnini